Taijiang County is a county in eastern Guizhou province, China. It is under the administration of the Qiandongnan Miao and Dong Autonomous Prefecture.

Taijiang County is a county under the jurisdiction of Qiandongnan Prefecture, Guizhou Province. It is located in the southeastern part of Guizhou Province and the middle of Qiandongnan Miao and Dong Autonomous Prefecture. There are Highway 65 and National Highway 320 passing through the county. According to the seventh census data, as of 0:00 on November 1, 2020, the resident population of Taijiang County was 122,861.

Climate
Taijiang belongs to the mid-subtropical mild and humid climate zone, with abundant rainfall, no severe cold in winter and no extreme heat in summer.

References

External links

County-level divisions of Guizhou
Counties of Qiandongnan Prefecture